Carol Cummings (born 15 November 1949) is a Jamaican sprinter. She competed in the women's 100 metres at the 1976 Summer Olympics.

References

1949 births
Living people
Athletes (track and field) at the 1972 Summer Olympics
Athletes (track and field) at the 1976 Summer Olympics
Jamaican female sprinters
Olympic athletes of Jamaica
Pan American Games bronze medalists for Jamaica
Pan American Games medalists in athletics (track and field)
Athletes (track and field) at the 1967 Pan American Games
Athletes (track and field) at the 1975 Pan American Games
Place of birth missing (living people)
Medalists at the 1967 Pan American Games
Olympic female sprinters
20th-century Jamaican women
21st-century Jamaican women